Yelena Ivanovna Shidyanskaya nee Yelena Ivanovna Sardanova, 1755–1849) was a Greek-Russian military commander.  She was an ethnic Greek Crimean appointed commander of the "Amazon company" appointed by Grigory Potemkin to serve during the visit of Catherine the Great to the Crimea in 1787.  While this military unit was largely ceremonial and existed only during Catherine's visit, it was nevertheless formally a military unit during its existence, and Yelena Shidyanskaya was thereby the first woman in Russia to be appointed to the post of commander of a military unit.

References

1755 births
1849 deaths
18th-century military personnel from the Russian Empire
Female military personnel
Women in 18th-century warfare